Xiong Dunhan (born 11 November 1998) is a Chinese water polo player. 

She was part of the Chinese team at the  2015 World Aquatics Championships, and the 2016 Summer Olympics.

See also
 China at the 2015 World Aquatics Championships

References

External links
 
 
 
 
 http://www.waterpoloplanet.com/HTML_link_pages/15_World_Championships_W.html
 http://www.sjsuspartans.com/sports/w-wpolo/recaps/010815aab.html
 http://www.zimbio.com/pictures/UQs9OZnalrL/Water+Polo+Olympics+Day+4/BztjaVJMitP/Dunhan+Xiong

1998 births
Living people
Chinese female water polo players
Olympic water polo players of China
Water polo players at the 2016 Summer Olympics
Water polo players at the 2020 Summer Olympics
Asian Games gold medalists for China
Asian Games medalists in water polo
Water polo players at the 2018 Asian Games
Medalists at the 2018 Asian Games
Place of birth missing (living people)
21st-century Chinese women